Rouse Hill is a suburb of Sydney, in the state of New South Wales, Australia. Rouse Hill is located in the Hills District, 43 kilometres north-west of the Sydney central business district and 19 kilometres north-west of the Parramatta central business district. It is in the local government areas of The Hills Shire and City of Blacktown. Rouse Hill Town Centre is at the heart of the suburb, which contains a busy Town Square.

History
Rouse Hill encompasses what was originally known as the Village of Aberdour along with the area that became known as 'Vinegar Hill' following the convict rebellion of 1804.

Rouse Hill is noteworthy in Australian history as the site of the main battle during an Irish convict rebellion, known as the Castle Hill rebellion or the 'Second Battle of Vinegar Hill'. On 4 March 1804, Irish convicts including political prisoners transported for participating in the Irish Rebellion of 1798, broke out of the Government Farm at Castle Hill, aiming to seize control of the area and to capture Parramatta. The uprising was crushed by the military authorities at Rouse Hill the following day with at least fifteen rebels killed during the battle. Nine of the rebel leaders were executed and hundreds were punished. The exact site of the Battle is uncertain but a monument with a plaque commemorating the event can be seen within Castlebrook Lawn Cemetery on Windsor Road in Kellyville Ridge.

The name Rouse Hill perpetuates the name of Richard Rouse (1774-1852), a public servant and free settler, who received a grant of land in the area.  Rouse arrived in the colony in 1801. In October 1816 he was granted 450 acres at Vinegar Hill (named after the 1804 convict insurrection).  Rouse had taken possession of the land at an earlier date because he began building his family home there in 1813. There were ongoing official efforts to dispense with the name Vinegar Hill, due to the association with the 1804 uprising.  Governor Macquarie changed the name of the locality to Rouse Hill, but the alternate name Vinegar Hill persisted until at least the 1860s.

The first daily mail coach between Windsor and Sydney commenced in 1831. A change of horses was made at the Rouse Hill Hotel, at that time kept by the publican John Booth (known as 'Crockery Bill').

Vinegar Hill Post Office opened on 1 October 1857 and was renamed Rouse Hill on 13 April 1858.

The Rouse Hill Hotel closed in 1891.

Heritage listings 

Rouse Hill has a number of heritage-listed sites, including:
 Hunting Lodge, Rouse Hill
 Royal Oak Inn, Rouse Hill
 Mungerie House, Rouse Hill

Rouse Hill House

Richard Rouse built his Australian Georgian home, Rouse Hill House, from 1813-18. Service wings and an arcaded courtyard were added . The simple, geometric layout of the garden is probably the oldest surviving in Australia. The house, its immediate surviving estate and outbuildings including stables designed by John Horbury Hunt, is now a house museum cared for by Sydney Living Museums, and is listed on the New South Wales State Heritage Register, and the former Register of the National Estate. Much of the family memorabilia has been preserved, including dolls, clothes and writings of the two girls, Nina (1875-1968) and Kathleen Rouse (1878-1932). These form a unique and fascinating record of late-Victorian Australian childhood, and inspired Ursula Dubosarsky's prize-winning novel "Abyssinia".

Commercial area

Rouse Hill Town Centre built on the old golf course is the town centre, owned and managed by The GPT Group, is located at the intersection of White Hart Drive and Windsor Roads. The first stage opened in September 2007 with the launch of the town centre on 6 March 2008. The first stage comprises Woolworths and Coles supermarkets, a food terrace, and 80 specialty stores . The second stage comprises Big W, Target (now Kmart), Reading Cinemas, an additional 130 specialty stores, a Community Centre, Library, Medical Centre, commercial and residential accommodation and the Secret Garden. The development has been integrated with the North-West T-way and Rouse Hill railway station opened in 2019.

Rouse Hill Village Centre which opened in 1999, is a small shopping centre located on Windsor Road.  This complex features a major discount supermarket chain selling packaged groceries and perishables, as well as specialty shops and restaurants. The Terrace is another small shopping centre which was opened on Panmure Street in 2004.

Churches

 Christ Church, an Anglican church located on Windsor Road, was built in 1863 for the United Church of England and Ireland (Warren et al. 2006). It was a church, school and the centre of most community events. In 2008, a Ministry and Education Centre opened alongside the restored Christ Church and the old hall built in 1908. In 1875, the school was relocated from the church and established as Rouse Hill Public School on the corner of Windsor Road and Annangrove Road, and then relocated once again in 2003 to its present site.

Education
 Ironbark Ridge Public - Public Primary School
  Our Lady of the Angels Primary - Catholic Primary School
 Rouse Hill Anglican College - K-12 co-educational Anglican day independent school
 Rouse Hill High - Public High School
 Rouse Hill Public - Public Primary School

Transport
Rouse Hill is bisected by Windsor Road, which is now a major 4-lane road running from North Parramatta north-west to Windsor. Most residents of Rouse Hill are reliant on private cars for transport, with a high number of households having two or more cars.

Hillsbus provides services to Sydney CBD, North Sydney, Parramatta, Macquarie Park, and Castle Hill. Busways provides services to Blacktown, Riverstone and Castle Hill. Hillsbus also provides weekday services from Rouse Hill to Windsor. In September 2007, the North-West T-way opened, providing a bus rapid transit service to Parramatta railway station.

The Sydney Metro Northwest provides high frequency rail services to Chatswood. Rouse Hill station is located within the suburb.

Demographics
At the 2016 census, the suburb of Rouse Hill recorded a population of 7,965 people. Of these: 
 Age distribution: Residents had a distinct bias towards young families compared to the country overall.  The median age was 34 years, compared to the national median of 38 years. Children aged under 15 years made up 26.2% of the population (national average is 18.7%) and people aged 65 years and over made up 7.6% of the population (national average is 15.8%).
  Ethnic diversity: 68.8% were born in Australia, which is higher than the national average of 66.7%; the next most common countries of birth were Philippines 3.6%, England 3.3%, China 2.4%, India 2.2% and South Africa 1.9%.  74.1% of people only spoke English at home. Other languages spoken at home included Mandarin 3.2%, Tagalog 2.2%, Arabic 1.6% and Hindi 1.4%.
  Religion: The most common responses for religion were Catholic 32.5%, No Religion 18.5% and Anglican 18.3%.
 Finances: The median household weekly income was $2,401, compared to the national median of $1,438. This difference is also reflected in real estate, with the median mortgage payment being $2,600 per month, compared to the national median of $1,755.
 Transport: On the day of the Census, 11.9% of employed people traveled to work on public transport and 73.4% by car (either as driver or as passenger).
 Housing: 59.5% of occupied private dwellings were separate houses, 33.7% were semi-detached. The average household size was 3.4 people.

References

External links

 [CC-By-SA]

 
Suburbs of Sydney
1802 establishments in Australia
The Hills Shire
City of Blacktown